The 2019 European Rowing Championships was held in Lucerne, Switzerland from 31 May to 2 June 2019.

Medal summary

Men

Women

Medal table

References

European Rowing Championships
2019
European Rowing Championships
Rowing competitions in Switzerland
Rowing in Switzerland
European Rowing Championships
European Rowing Championships
Sport in Lucerne